Lee Young-ae (born January 31, 1971) is a South Korean actress. She is known for her appearances in the Korean historical drama Dae Jang Geum (2003), and as a revenge seeking single mother in Park Chan-wook's crime thriller film Sympathy for Lady Vengeance (2005). For her performance in the film, she received Best Actress awards at the 38th Sitges Film Festival, 26th Blue Dragon Film Awards and 42nd Baeksang Arts Awards.

Career 
Lee made her debut as a model in 1991. After appearing in television commercials, she debuted as an actress in the 1993 drama How's Your Husband?, which won her Best New Actress at the SBS Drama Awards.

In 2000, she starred in the mystery thriller film Joint Security Area, which became the highest-grossing Korean film at that time. She followed this with melodrama Last Present, where she received acclaim for her performance as a young woman facing the realities of an early death.
Lee reunited with  director Hur Jin-ho to star in his next film One Fine Spring Day, which won her Best Actress at the Busan Film Critics Awards.
She also starred in the TV series Fireworks, which introduced Lee to Taiwan audiences.

Lee came to prominence in South Korea after starring in the historical drama Dae Jang Geum. It first aired from September 15, 2003 to March 23, 2004 on MBC, where it was the top program with an average viewership rating of 46.3% and a peak of 57.8%, making it the 10th highest rated Korean drama of all time. Lee won the Daesang (Grand Prize) award at the MBC Drama Awards, as well as the Top Excellence award. The show was then aired overseas in 91 countries and became exceptionally popular in Asia.
The fame of Dae Jang Geum launched Lee into pan-Asia stardom as one of the biggest Hallyu stars. She has been invited to visit mainland China, Hong Kong, Taiwan, Singapore and Japan.
In 2006, for the first time in 12 years, NHK had to use the NHK Hall to host the NHK show due to her popularity; stamps featuring Lee were released in Japan.
She was also invited to the 2007 Harbin International Ice and Snow Sculpture Festival in China.

Lee then starred in the third installment in Park Chan-wook's The Vengeance Trilogy, titled Sympathy For Lady Vengeance. She was awarded Best Actress at the 2005 Blue Dragon Film Awards and 2006 Baeksang Art Awards for her performance in the film.

In 2006, Lee was invited sit on the jury bench of the 56th Berlin International Film Festival, becoming the first Korean actress to be selected as a jury member of the international film festival.

In 2007, she received the Medal of Culture Merit for her contribution to the Korean Wave from the South Korean government.

In 2015, it was announced that Lee would be making her comeback to television in SBS historical series Saimdang, Memoir of Colors. She would be playing dual roles as Shin Saimdang, a famed Joseon-era artist and calligrapher as well as a modern-day Korean history lecturer. The drama premiered in January 2017.

In 2018, Lee was cast in the film Bring Me Home, returning to the big screen after 13 years.

In 2022, Lee was invited to be the jury member of the 27th Busan International Film Festival's "Actor of the Year Award".

Philanthropy 
Besides her acting career, Lee has been involved with several charities. In 1997, she went to Ethiopia as a NGO Goodwill Ambassador. She went to Thar Desert in 1999 to do a TV show about people in India's lowest social caste. Later in 2001, she described these experiences in her autobiography “A Most Special Love” with partial English and donated the income from the sale of the book to charity.

She was appointed a goodwill ambassador in 2004 by UNICEF and has since held several charity posts. She has made many donations to schools and hospitals, including Chosun First Middle School in Harbin and an elementary school in China that was later renamed Lee Young-Ae Elementary School. In 2012, she served as the celebrity spokesperson for the "Love Donation" project, hosted by the magazine Woman Chosun. She made a donation to build a school in Myanmar.

In 2012, Lee launched a business for organic and eco-friendly products for children in Seoul.

In July 2014, Taiwanese media reported that Lee had privately assisted a pregnant Taiwanese woman vacationing with her husband in Seoul. The woman gave birth to a girl prematurely and the infant had several complications. Lee found out about the couple through her friend and decided to pay their medical bills of NT$4 million (US$134,000) because the infant required two surgeries and constant medical care after she was born. Lee was subsequently given an award by Taiwan's Chou Ta-Kuan Cultural and Educational Foundation. In 2016, she helped a Vietnamese girl who went to Korea to treat her brain tumor by donating 37 million won for the operation and other medical bills.

In Sri Lanka, she is known as "Changumi", and her popularity there led to the creation of the Sujatha Diyani Scholarship Fund in 2014, when she donated US$100,000. The fund aims at providing financial assistance to female students from low-income families. Lee also became the first actress to join the "Chime for Change" campaign of Gucci to "raise funds and awareness for projects promoting education, health, and justice for girls and women" around the world.

In 2015, Lee was appointed special envoy by the UNESCO Korean Commission. She promotes the commission's activities such as fundraising and a campaign to render educational support to underdeveloped countries.

In March 2022, Lee donated 100 million won to Ukraine, which was damaged by the Russian invasion, along with a letter of consolation to the people of Ukraine.

On May 1, 2022, Lee donated 100 million won to the Sowon Foundation Office in Yangpyeong City Gyeonggi-do Province to assist patients who have difficulty getting out of the house due to childhood cancer or rare diseases.

On August 19, 2022, Lee donated  to help those affected by the 2022 South Korean floods through the Korea Foundation for the Disabled.

On November 3, 2022, Lee made a donation to help the victims of the Seoul Halloween crowd crush through donations to Korea Welfare Foundation for the Disabled.

On January 22, 2023, Lee donated 50 million won to residents affected by the fire in Guryong Village, Gangnam District, Seoul.

Endorsements 
In 1991, Lee made her debut as a rookie model, became known through a TV commercial for Pacific Chemical's (now Amore Pacific) cosmetics brand Mamonde. Her urban image with her raised hair and trench coat collar left a strong impression on viewers, and Lee Young-ae, who was studying "German Language and Literature" at Hanyang University at that moment, rose to stardom with the modifier Oxygen Lady. At that time, Mamonde became the most successful brand in the history of Pacific Chemical. The product Tropic Orange Makeup, which was released in March 1994, achieved a record of selling 1.5 million units in two months. Due to the popularity of Mamonde and Lee Young-ae, competitors also poured out advertisements with a similar concept in 1997. She had been the face of Mamonde for 10 years.

Since 2007, Lee became the global ambassador of LG Household & Health Care’s super-premium beauty brand The History of Whoo until now.

In 2020, Lee had been selected as Korean ambassador for Ferragamo Eyewear.

In July 2022, she was selected as the model for the new product "Lifening Beauty Collagen Ampoule" of the inner beauty brand Lifening.

Personal life 
In 2009, Lee married Jeong Ho-young, a Korean-American businessman who was twenty years older than her. On February 20, 2011, she gave birth to twins, a boy and a girl.

Filmography

Film

Television series

Television show

Awards and nominations

References and notes

External links 

 Lee Young-ae at Good People Entertainment
 
 
 

Blue Dragon Film Award winners
South Korean film actresses
South Korean television actresses
South Korean television personalities
South Korean female models
Chung-Ang University alumni
Actresses from Seoul
1971 births
Living people
20th-century South Korean actresses
21st-century South Korean actresses
Hanyang University alumni
Best Actress Paeksang Arts Award (film) winners